Jan Hájek (born 7 August 1983) is a retired male professional tennis player from the Czech Republic. He reached the third round of the 2007 French Open and attained a career-high ATP singles ranking of World No. 71 in November 2006.

Career

Hájek turned professional in 2000 and won his first Futures event in Negril of the same year defeating Johan Örtegren in the final. Between 2000 and 2003 Hájek played primarily on the Futures circuit, then after that he played some Challenger events as well as the Futures tournaments. At the end of 2005 he had won 8 Futures titles all on clay, which is his best surface.

2006 was the breakthrough season for Hájek, as he started the year ranked at 352 and then finished the season ranked at 76th in the world. Hájek won his first challenger in Barletta as a qualifier easily defeating Stefano Galvani 6–2, 6–1 in the final. In May Hájek qualified for the challenger in Prague before losing to compatriot Robin Vik in the final. Hájek won three more Challengers during the year including two major ones in Prostějov where he got a retirement victory over Tomáš Berdych and Braunschweig defeated Fernando Vicente in straight sets. He won the Poznań Challenger without losing a set. In addition to the three Challenger titles, Hájek made his debut at Grand Slam level where he defeated Lukáš Dlouhý in straight sets before losing to Fernando González.

Hájek was unable to follow up the previously successful year in 2007, but he achieved his best result at Grand Slam level, where he made the third round at Roland Garros where he defeated Thomas Johansson and Bohdan Ulihrach before retiring against Marcos Baghdatis with a shoulder injury. Since then Hájek has had injury problems with the shoulder and problems with his heart.

At the beginning of 2009 Hájek started the year ranked at 474 and has been playing on the Challenger circuit and he has been playing qualifications and after qualifying for the main draw in Athens he lost in the semi finals to Rui Machado. Hájek won the Ostrava Challenger after qualifying defeating Ivan Dodig 7–5, 6–1. He repeated his 2006 victory in Prostějov this time as a qualifier defeating Belgian Steve Darcis in the final and former top 10 player Ivan Ljubičić in the quarter finals. Hájek won his third challenger of the year in Freudenstadt defeating Laurent Recouderc in the final. He also made his debut in the Czech Davis Cup team in the semi final tie against Croatia where he defeated Roko Karanušić and also played in the final losing to Rafael Nadal. Hájek has a 1–2 record in Davis Cup singles with none of these matches being a live rubber.

After ending the 2009 season ranked No. 103, Hájek made a return to the Grand Slam arena at the 2010 Australian Open, defeating Robby Ginepri before losing to Mikhail Youzhny. He also reached his first quarter-final on the ATP tour at Munich losing to Youzhny again. Hájek became the first man to win the Prostějov Challenger three times after Radek Štěpánek had to retire from the final due to illness.

ATP career finals

Doubles: 2 (1–1)

Singles titles

Grand Slam performance timelines

Singles

Doubles

References

External links 

 

 Hajek World ranking history

1983 births
Living people
Czech male tennis players
Sportspeople from Olomouc